Michael or Mike Davis may refer to:

Arts and entertainment
 Michael Davis (bassist) (1943–2012), American bass guitarist, singer, record producer
 Michael Davis (juggler) (born 1953), American juggler, comedian, and musician
 Michael Earl Davis (born 1959), American puppeteer, actor, writer, singer
 Michael Davis (director) (born 1961), American film director and screenwriter
 Michael Davis (trombonist) (born 1961), American jazz trombonist
 Mick Davis (director) (born 1961), Scottish film director, producer and screenwriter
 Mike Davis (guitarist) (born c. 1970), American guitarist
 Michael Cory Davis (fl. 2003), American actor, filmmaker, and activist
 Mike Davis (screenwriter), American screenwriter, producer, and director
 Michael Davis (artist), American artist
 Michael Davis (comics creator), co-founder of Milestone Media

Politics and government
 Michael Davis (Australian lawyer)
 Michael Davis (Irish politician) (1875–1944), Irish politician
 Michael Davis (author) (born 1946), English political author
 Mike Davis (scholar) (1946–2022), American writer, political activist, urban theorist, and historian
 Michael J. Davis (born 1947), American judge
 Mike Davis (politician) (born 1957), American politician from California
 Michael K. Davis, American justice of the Wyoming Supreme Court since 2012
 Michael E. Davis (politician), American politician from Alaska
Michael Davis (Missouri politician), politician from Missouri

Sports

American football
 Michael Davis (defensive back) (born 1995), American football defensive back
 Mike Davis (defensive back, born 1956) (1956–2021), American football defensive back in the 1970s and 80s
 Mike Davis (defensive back, born 1972), American football defensive back in the 1990s 
 Mike Davis (running back) (born 1993), American football running back
 Mike Davis (wide receiver) (born 1992), American football wide receiver
 Mike Davis (American football coach) (fl. 1975–76)

Basketball
 Mike Davis (basketball, born 1946), American basketball guard
 Mike Davis (basketball, born 1956), American basketball power forward
 Mike Davis (basketball, born 1988), American basketball forward
 Mike Davis (basketball coach) (born 1960), American basketball coach

Other sports
 Michael Earls-Davis (1921–2016), English cricketer
 Michael Davis (rower) (born 1940), American Olympic rower
 Michael Davis or Bugsy McGraw (born 1945), American professional wrestler
 Michael Davis (Australian footballer) (born 1961), former Australian rules footballer
 Michael Davis (Belgian footballer) (born 2002), footballer
 Mike Davis (rugby union) (1942–2022), English rugby player and coach
 Michael Davis (athlete) (born 1959), Jamaican Olympic sprinter
 Mike Davis (baseball) (born 1959), American baseball player
 Mike Davis (wrestler) (1956–2001), American professional wrestler
 Michael Davis (weightlifter), American weightlifter
 Mike Davis (fighter) (born 1992), American mixed martial artist

Other people
 Michael M. Davis (1879–1971), American health care policy specialist
 Michael DeMond Davis (1939–2003), American journalist
 Mike Davis (boat builder) (1939–2008), American boat builder and boating advocate
 Michael Davis (philosopher) (born 1943), American philosopher, author, and professor
 Michael C. Davis (born 1949), professor of law and international affairs
 Michael Peter Davis (born 1947), American philosopher
 Mick Davis (born 1958), South African-British businessman
 Michael E. Davis (businessman), American businessman on the initial Wikimedia Foundation Board of Trustees

See also
 Michael Davies (disambiguation)